Jaffray, British Columbia is an unincorporated village in southeast British Columbia. As of the RDEK 2011 census, the population was 820  , spread over a rural area of roughly 44 square kilometres.

History

Jaffray was formerly a siding, depot and steam train water stop. In the early 1900s Robert Jaffray and several of his brothers worked at the local sawmills, eventually leaving and homesteading in Lacombe, Alberta, and even though some local people believed that Jaffray may have been named after the brothers, according to folklore, Jaffray had already been named by the time they came to the area. Frank Desrosier may have been the first resident to purchase land in the Jaffray town-site, purchasing District Lot 3055. In September 1900, Robert Elmsby received a crown grant on D.L. 3543, obtaining  for two hundred dollars, including most of what is now Jaffray proper.

Since the first residents settled in, Jaffray has had four hotels, including the Jaffray Hotel, the Henderson's Hotel, Desrosier's Hotel and the Pearson Hotel. Historical general stores included Anthony Modigh's General Store, Economy Corner Store, and the present Jaffray General Store.

Fire protection

In September 1995, the Regional District of East Kootenay, with the direction of founding Fire Chief John Betenia, and community approval of an RDEK bylaw, opened the Jaffray Volunteer Fire Department with 31 volunteer firefighter trainees.

The department has expanded considerably since inception and now includes a rescue team with First Responder Level III status.

Notable residents
The following notable people come from or were born near Jaffray:
 Dean Brody, country recording artist

Geography
Jaffray is located near the picturesque Steeples, which include Fisher Peak, and the Lizard Mountain ranges, not far from Lake Koocanusa. The village is found on Highway 3 and 93, west of the Elko, British Columbia's Highway 93 junction; just north of the Canadian/United States border at Rooseville, BC. This portion of the Rocky Mountain Trench is relatively flat, with open woodland and grasslands. The area is very popular for its great recreational opportunities.

Climate

Education

This East Kootenay village is home to the Jaffray Elementary Junior Secondary School, which has over 200 students from Jaffray and surrounding communities . This public school is run by School District 5 Southeast Kootenay.

Radio stations
(broadcast from Jaffray)
 101.3 FM - CBC Radio One, repeater located in Jaffray.

(available in Jaffray (broadcast from Cranbrook))
 107.5 FM - CFSM-FM, 107.5 2Day FM
 104.7 FM - CHBZ-FM, B-104
 102.9 FM - CHDR-FM, The Drive FM

External links
Singer/Songwriter Dean Brody Website
Acrylic Artist John de Jong Website
South Country Fire Services Facebook Page

Notes

Unincorporated settlements in British Columbia
Populated places in the Regional District of East Kootenay
Designated places in British Columbia